Chuck Huber is an American voice actor, ADR director, and writer primarily known for his work for Funimation and OkraTron 5000.  He has provided numerous voices for Japanese anime series and video games. He is best known for his roles as Hiei in Yu Yu Hakusho, Dr. Franken Stein in Soul Eater, Pilaf in Dragon Ball, Shou Tucker in Fullmetal Alchemist, Android #17 in Dragon Ball Z and Turner Grey in Ace Attorney.

Career

Huber has also been a TV, film and stage actor in over 20 years, most notably at Chicago’s Steppenwolf and Goodman Theaters; as the Director/Writer of Arbor Day - The Musical; as a producer, co-writer and co-star of the bilingual feature Fragility of Seconds, which took the top prize at the Houston International Film Festival; and in guest starring roles on NBC, FOX, CBS dramas. Huber is a Stage West board member.

Huber has also worked in the education field as a workshop leader, teacher and principal for 20 years in a variety of settings from Southern Methodist University's Cox School of Business to communities in Owerri, Nigeria; as a founder, consultant or board member for five different schools, and as an author of numerous articles for education periodicals, children's books, plays and screenplays.

Personal life
On December 15, 2010, Huber suffered a heart attack. As a self-employed actor, he had no medical insurance. However, many friends and fans made donations to help cover the expenses. He has since made a full recovery.

Huber was previously married to Kirsten Fischer, with whom he has six children. In 2015, Huber became engaged to artist Jessica von Braun and they married in November 2016. Huber supports the theories that the Earth is flat, as well as conspiracy theories about the September 11 attacks, COVID-19 and the Moon landings.

Filmography

Live-action
 American Crime – Dean Hanson
 Star Trek Continues – Leonard McCoy

Voice acting

Anime

Film

Video Games

Books

References

External links

 
 
 
 

Living people
American male voice actors
American voice directors
American Roman Catholics
American television writers
American male screenwriters
American male video game actors
American male television writers
Funimation
Catholics from Illinois
Male actors from Chicago
Screenwriters from Illinois
Schoolteachers from Illinois
Year of birth missing (living people)
American conspiracy theorists
Flat Earth proponents
9/11 conspiracy theorists
COVID-19 conspiracy theorists
Moon landing conspiracy theorists